Basket of Light is a 1969 album by the folk rock group Pentangle. It reached no. 5 on the UK Albums Chart. A single from the album, "Light Flight", the theme from BBC1's first colour drama series Take Three Girls, reached no. 43 on the UK Singles Chart. Another single from the album, "Once I Had a Sweetheart", reached no. 46 in the charts.

The album's liner notes state that "Springtime Promises" was written "after a ride on a number 74 bus from Gloucester Road to Greencroft Gardens on an early spring day".

Legacy
The album was included in the books 1001 Albums You Must Hear Before You Die  and 1,000 Recordings to Hear Before You Die.

Tracks

The album cover uses photographs of Pentangle's 1968 concert in the Royal Albert Hall. A note about the instrumentation states that "All the instruments played on this album are acoustic."

Personnel
Pentangle
Terry Cox – drums, glockenspiel, hand drum, lead and backing vocals
Bert Jansch – lead and backing vocals, guitar, banjo on "House Carpenter"
Jacqui McShee – lead and backing vocals
John Renbourn – lead and backing vocals, guitar, sitar
Danny Thompson – double bass
Technical
Shel Talmy – producer
Damon Lyon-Shaw – engineer
John Pantry – engineer

Released versions

Basket of Light was released as a UK LP on 26 October 1969, as Transatlantic  TRA2O5. The U.S. version, in the same year was Reprise  R56372. The album was re-released as a digitally remastered CD in 2001, as Castle CMRCD207, which includes two alternate takes of "Sally Go 'Round the Roses" and the non-album B-sides: "Cold Mountain" and "I Saw an Angel".

References 

1969 albums
Pentangle (band) albums
Albums produced by Shel Talmy
Transatlantic Records albums
Reprise Records albums
Albums recorded at IBC Studios